Akhnaten is an opera in three acts based on the life and religious convictions of the Egyptian pharaoh Akhenaten (Amenhotep IV), written by the American composer Philip Glass in 1983. The libretto is by Philip Glass in association with Shalom Goldman, Robert Israel, Richard Riddell, and Jerome Robbins. According to the composer, this work is the culmination of his two other biographical operas, Einstein on the Beach (about Albert Einstein) and Satyagraha (about Mahatma Gandhi). These three people were all driven by an inner vision which altered the age in which they lived: Akhenaten in religion, Einstein in science, and Gandhi in politics.

The text, taken from original sources, is sung in the original languages, linked together with the commentary of a narrator in a modern language, such as English or German. Egyptian texts of the period are taken from a poem of Akhenaten himself, from the Book of the Dead, and from extracts of decrees and letters from the Amarna Period, the seventeen-year period of Akhenaten's rule. Other portions are in Akkadian and Biblical Hebrew. Akhnaten's Hymn to the Sun is sung in the language of the audience.

Performance history 
Akhnaten was commissioned by Württembergische Staatstheater, Stuttgart and had its world premiere on March 24, 1984, at the Stuttgart State Theatre, under the German title Echnaton. Paul Esswood sang the title role, German director Achim Freyer staged the opera in an abstract style with highly ritualistic movements. The American premiere, directed by David Freeman, was on October 12, 1984, at the Houston Grand Opera, where Glass's opera The Making of the Representative for Planet 8 also premiered. The UK premiere, based on the American production, was on June 17, 1985, by English National Opera at the London Coliseum. This production was revived at the London Coliseum in March 1987.

The award-winning Polish premiere, directed by Henryk Baranowski, was on May 20, 2000, at the Grand Theatre in Łódź. The French premiere was on September 23, 2002, at Opéra national du Rhin in Strasbourg as a co-production with Boston Lyric Opera which had premiered the production in February 2002
A new co-production by English National Opera and LA Opera and in collaboration with Improbable directed by Phelim McDermott starring Anthony Roth Costanzo and Zachary James premiered at the London Coliseum on March 4, 2016, which won a 2017 Olivier Award, and at LA Opera on November 5, 2016. A revival of this production in London took place in March 2019 and played at the Metropolitan Opera in their 2019/2020 season. The 2019 Met production was streamed online on June 20 and November 14, 2020, and February 12, 2021, and returned in 2022. A new production directed and choreographed by Nanine Linning premiered at Theater Heidelberg on June 6, 2014, another new production directed by Laura Scozzi premiered at Oper Bonn on March 11, 2018.

A November 2020 production at Opéra de Nice Côte d’Azur was performed without an audience and screened online, due to the COVID-19 pandemic. This production was produced and choreographed by longtime Glass collaborator Lucinda Childs, who conducted rehearsals remotely. She also performed the speaking roles in the opera, which were pre-recorded and projected during the performance.

Roles

Music 
The orchestra's size is about the size employed for early 19th-century opera: 2 flutes (one doubling piccolo), 2 oboes (both doubling oboe d'amore), 2 clarinets, bass clarinet, 2 bassoons, 2 french horns, 2 trumpets, 2 trombones, tuba, percussion (3 players), celesta (doubling synthesizer), 12 violas, 8 celli, 6 double basses.

Apart from this, this was Glass's most "conventional" opera orchestra until then (compared to Einstein on the Beach, written for the six-piece Philip Glass Ensemble, and Satyagraha, scored for woodwinds and strings only).

Synopsis 
The opera is divided into three acts:

Act 1: Year 1 of Akhnaten's Reign in Thebes 
Thebes, 1370 BC

Prelude, verse 1, verse 2, verse 3

Set in the key of A minor, the strings introduce a ground bass theme, with following variations. (A passacaglia). The scribe recites funeral texts from the pyramids. "Open are the double doors of the horizon; unlocked are its bolts."

Scene 1: Funeral of Akhnaten's father Amenhotep III

Heralded by hammering drums, Aye and a small male chorus chant a funeral hymn in Egyptian, later joined by the full chorus. The music is basically a march, based on the chords of A major and F minor (with added major sixth), and grows to ecstatic intensity towards the end.

Scene 2: The Coronation of Akhnaten

After a lengthy orchestral introduction, during which Akhnaten appears, heralded by a solo trumpet, the High Priest, Aye, and Horemhab sing a ritual text. After that, the Narrator recites a list of royal titles bestowed upon Akhnaten, while he is crowned. After the coronation, the chorus repeats the ritual text from the beginning of the scene. Again, the main key is A minor.

Scene 3: The Window of Appearances

After an introduction in A minor, dominated by tubular bells, Akhnaten sings a praise to the Creator (in Egyptian) at the window of public appearances. This is the first time he actually sings, after he has already been on stage for 20 minutes (and 40 minutes into the opera) and the effect of his countertenor voice (which in 1983 was even more rare than nowadays) is startling. He is joined by Queen Tye, whose soprano soars high above the soon intertwining voices of the royal couple, and later by Nefertiti, who actually sings lower notes than he.

Act 2: Years 5 to 15 in Thebes and Akhetaten 
Scene 1: The Temple

The scene opens again in A minor, with the High Priest and a group of priests singing a hymn to Amun, principal god of the old order, in his temple. The music becomes increasingly dramatic, as Akhnaten, together with Queen Tye and his followers, attack the temple. This scene has only wordless singing. The harmonies grow very chromatic, finally reaching A major and E minor. The temple roof is removed and the sun god Aten's rays invade the temple, thus ending Amun's reign and laying the foundation for the worship of the only god Aten.

Scene 2: Akhnaten and Nefertiti

Two solo celli introduce a "love theme". Accompanied by a solo trombone while the harmony switches to H(sus), the Narrator recites a prayer-like poem to the sun god. The strings softly take over the music in E minor, and the same poem is recited again, this time actually as a love poem from Akhnaten to Nefertiti. Then Akhnaten and Nefertiti sing the same text to each other (in Egyptian), as an intimate love duet. After a while, the trumpet associated with Akhnaten joins them as the highest voice, turning the duet into a trio.

Scene 3: The City – Dance

The Narrator speaks a text taken from the boundary stones of the new capital of the empire, Akhet-Aten (The Horizon of Aten), describing the construction of the city, with large, light-filled spaces. After a brass fanfare, the completion of the city is celebrated in a light-hearted dance, contrasting with the stark, ritualistic music with which this act began. (In the Stuttgart premiere, the dance actually described the construction of the city.) The dance scene was omitted from the UK premiere production and its 1987 revival.

Scene 4: Hymn

What now follows is a hymn to the only god Aten, a long aria (alternating between A minor and A major) by Akhnaten, and the central piece of the opera. Notably, it is the only text sung in the language of the audience, praising the sun giving life to everything. After the aria, an off-stage chorus sings Psalm 104 in Hebrew, dating some 400 years later, which has strong resemblances to Akhnaten's Hymn, thus emphasizing Akhnaten as the first founder of a monotheistic religion.

Act 3: Year 17 and the Present 
Akhnaten, 1358 BC

Scene 1: The Family

Two oboes d'amore play the "love theme" from act 2. Akhnaten, Nefertiti and their six daughters, sing wordlessly in contemplation. They are oblivious to what happens outside of the palace. As the music switches from E minor to F minor, the Narrator reads letters from Syrian vassals, asking for help against their enemies. Since the king does not send troops, his land is being seized and plundered by their enemies. The scene focuses again on Akhnaten and his family, still oblivious to the country falling apart.

Scene 2: The Attack and Fall of the City

The music moves again to a vigorous F minor. Horemhab, Aye and the High Priest of Aten instigate the people (as the chorus), singing part of the vassal's letters (in their original Akkadian language) until finally the palace is attacked, the royal family killed, and the city of the sun destroyed.

Scene 3: The Ruins

The music of the very beginning of the opera returns. The scribe recites an inscription on Aye's tomb, praising the death of "the heretic" and the new reign of the old gods. He then describes the restoration of Amun's temple by Akhnaten's son Tutankhamun. The Prelude music grows stronger and the scene moves to present-day Egypt, to the ruins of Amarna, the former capital Akhetaten. The Narrator appears as a modern tourist guide and speaks a text from a guide book, describing the ruins. "There is nothing left of this glorious city of temples and palaces."

Scene 4: Epilogue

The ghosts of Akhnaten, Nefertiti and Queen Tye appear, singing wordlessly amongst the ruins. The funeral procession from the beginning of the opera appears on the horizon, and they join it. The music introduces a bass line from the beginning of Einstein on the Beach, the first part of Glass's "portrait" trilogy (The second one being Satyagraha and the third one Akhnaten), thus providing a musical bracket for the whole trilogy.

References

Further reading
 Stuttgart State Theater, world premiere, programme (1984)
 A Composer's Notes – Philip Glass and the Making of an Opera, Michael Blackwood (Director), (1985)
 CD booklet (Soloists, chorus and orchestra of the Stuttgart State Opera, Dennis Russell Davies, cond., CBS 1987)

External links 
 Akhnaten, philipglass.com
 
 Philip Glass: Akhnaten (Live from the Met), online streaming of a complete live recording at Bandcamp
 "Massenmord am Nil", review of the premiere, by Rudolf Hohlweg, Die Zeit, 30 March 1984 
 Opera Britannia review, 4 February 2016
 Interview with the four main cast members from MET's 2019 production – Anthony Roth Costanzo, J'Nai Bridges, Dísella Lárusdóttir and Zakary James, by Egyptologist Dominic Perry, 29 October 2019 (date provided in e-mail by the interviewer)
  published December 4, 2019 Vox Media

Operas by Philip Glass
1984 operas
Operas
Opera
Operas set in ancient Egypt
Minimalist operas
Multiple-language operas
Akhnaten Opera
Compositions with a narrator
Philip Glass albums